Hiskey is a surname. Notable people with the surname include:

Babe Hiskey (born 1938), American golfer
Clarence Hiskey (1912–1998), Soviet spy in the United States
Richard Grant Hiskey (1929–2016), American chemist

See also
Hickey (surname)